The 2015 UCI Juniors Track World Championships was the annual Junior World Championship for track cycling held at the Saryarka Velodrome in Astana, Kazakhstan from 19 to 23 August 2015.

Medals were won across 19 disciplines.

Medal summary

Medal table

References

External links

UCI mini-site

UCI Juniors Track World Championships
UCI Juniors Track World Championships, 2015
Track cycling
Sport in Astana
International sports competitions hosted by Kazakhstan